Houstonia wrightii, the pygmy bluet, is a plant species in the  Rubiaceae. It is native to the south-western United States (Arizona, New Mexico, western Texas) and northern Mexico (Chihuahua, Sonora, Hidalgo).

References

External links
Northern Arizona Flora
Vascular Plants of the Gila Wilderness
Gardening Europe
Intermountain Region Herbarium Network

wrightii
Flora of Arizona
Flora of New Mexico
Flora of Chihuahua (state)
Flora of Sonora
Flora of Hidalgo (state)
Flora of Texas
Plants described in 1882